Elbio Maximiliano Álvarez Wallace (born 13 June 1994) is a Uruguayan professional footballer who plays as midfielder.

Club career
Álvarez was born in Montevideo, Uruguay. On 29 January 2015, the former Peñarol player, joined Portuguese champions S.L. Benfica, along with countryman Jonathan Rodríguez, being assigned to the reserve team. On 15 March 2015, he debuted for Benfica B as a substitute in an away win at Farense (0–3) in Segunda Liga.

Honours
Uruguay
FIFA U-17 World Cup: Runner-up 2011

References

External links
 
 

1994 births
Living people
Footballers from Montevideo
Uruguayan footballers
Association football midfielders
Peñarol players
S.L. Benfica B players
Liga Portugal 2 players
Uruguay youth international footballers
Uruguayan expatriate footballers
Expatriate footballers in Portugal
Uruguayan expatriate sportspeople in Portugal